The Visible Multi-Object Spectrograph (VIMOS) is a wide field imager and a multi-object spectrograph installed at the European Southern Observatory's Very Large Telescope (VLT), in Chile. The instrument used for deep astronomical surveys delivers visible images and spectra of up to 1,000 galaxies at a time. VIMOS images four rectangular areas of the sky, 7 by 8 arcminutes each, with gaps of 2 arcminutes between them. Its principal investigator was Olivier Le Fèvre.

The Franco-Italian instrument operates in the visible part of the spectrum from 360 to 1000 nanometers (nm). In the conceptual design phase, the multi-object spectrograph then called VIRMOS included an additional instrument, NIMOS, operating in the near-infrared spectrum of 1100–1800 nm.

Operating in the three different observation modes, direct imaging, multi-slit spectroscopy, and integral field spectroscopy, the main objective of the instrument is to study the early universe through massive redshift surveys, such as the VIMOS-VLT Deep Survey.

VIMOS saw its first light on 26 February, 2002, and has since been mounted on the Nasmyth B focus of VLT's Melipal unit telescope (UT3).

It was retired in 2018 to make space for the return of CRIRES+.

Gallery

See also 
 List of instruments at the Very Large Telescope

References 

Astronomical instruments
Telescope instruments
Spectrographs
2002 introductions
2002 establishments in Chile